Rina Lasnier,  (6 August 1915 – 9 May 1997) was a Québécois poet. Born in St-Grégoire d'Iberville-Mont-Saint-Grégoire, Quebec, she attended Collège Marguerite Bourgeoys and the Université de Montréal. Although she was the author of several plays, including Féerie indienne (her first published book in 1939), she is chiefly remembered as a poet.

Lasnier was the recipient of many honours, including the Prix David (1943 and 1974), the Ludger-Duvernay Prize (1957), the Molson Prize (1971), the Prix France-Canada (1973) and the Lorne Pierce Medal (1974). In 1987, she was made a Grand Officer of the National Order of Quebec. She lived most her adult life in Joliette but returned to the St.-Jean-sur-Richelieu during her final years. A former church turned library in Joliette, Quebec was named after her.

Selected bibliography

Poetry
 Images et proses - 1941
 Madones canadiennes - 1944
 Le Chant de la montée - 1947
 Escales - 1950
 Présence de l'absence - 1956
 Mémoire sans jours - 1960
 Les Gisants - 1963
 L'arbre blanc - 1966
 L'Invisible - 1969
 La Salle des rêves - 1971
 Poèmes (two volumes) - 1972
 Le Rêve du quart jour - 1973
 Amour - 1975
 L'Échelle des anges - 1975
 Les Signes - 1976
 Matin d'oiseaux - 1978
 Paliers de paroles - 1978
 Entendre l'ombre - 1981
 Voir la nuit - 1981

Plays
 Féerie indienne - 1939
 Le Jeu de la voyagère - 1941
 Les Fiançailles d'Anne de Noüe - 1943
 Notre-Dame du Pain - 1947

References

External links
Rina Lasnier's entry in The Canadian Encyclopedia

1915 births
1997 deaths
Canadian women poets
Canadian women dramatists and playwrights
Grand Officers of the National Order of Quebec
Writers from Quebec
Canadian poets in French
Prix Athanase-David winners
20th-century Canadian dramatists and playwrights
20th-century Canadian poets
20th-century Canadian women writers
Canadian dramatists and playwrights in French